Jacques Maurice Hatry (Strasbourg, 12 February 1742 – Paris, 30 November 1802) was a French general.

A colonel on the outbreak of the French Revolution, he rose to général de division in 1794 and fought with distinction in the armée du Nord, des armée des Ardennes and Armée de la Moselle at the Battle of Fleurus and blockade of Luxembourg (where he forced a garrison of 12,000 men to surrender). In the armée de Sambre-et-Meuse, in the 1796 campaign, he was made général en chef of the armée de Mayence. In June  1798 he replaced general Joubert as commander of the troops stationed in the Netherlands. He was one of the first members of the Sénat conservateur in December 1799. His name is engraved on the north pillar, column 5, of the Arc de Triomphe.

Sources 

 
 

1742 births
1802 deaths
French commanders of the Napoleonic Wars
French generals
French Republican military leaders of the French Revolutionary Wars
Members of the Sénat conservateur
Military governors of Paris
Military personnel from Strasbourg
Names inscribed under the Arc de Triomphe